Events from the year 1630 in France

Incumbents
 Monarch – Louis XIII

Events
10 July – Battle of Veillane

Births

Full date missing
Charles La Tourasse, painter (died 1696)
Jacques Rousseau, painter (died 1693)
Gabriel Blanchard, painter (died 1704)
Jean-Baptiste de Santeul, poet (died 1697)

Deaths

 29 April – Agrippa d'Aubigné, poet, soldier and chronicler (born 1552)

Full date missing
Jacques de Harlay, nobleman
Charles Emmanuel I, Duke of Savoy (born 1562)

See also

References

1630s in France